Stairway can refer to the following:

A staircase, i.e. stairs
Stairway (band), a 1977-1980 British band formed by former members of the band Renaissance
Stairways (album), 1997 album by Nick Gilder 
Stairway to Heaven, a song by Led Zeppelin, commonly referred to simply as "Stairway"

See also
 Staircase (disambiguation)
 Stair (disambiguation)
 Step (disambiguation)